CPA may refer to:

Organizations

Political parties and governmental organizations
 Christian Peoples Alliance, a political party in the UK
 Coalition Provisional Authority, a transitional government of Iraq 2003–04
 Commonwealth Parliamentary Association
 Communist Party of America, forerunner of Communist Party USA
 Communist Party of Arakan, in Burma
 Communist Party of Australia, 1920–1991
 Communist Party of Australia (1971)
 Comprehensive Peace Accord, a 2006 agreement in Nepal
 Comprehensive Peace Agreement, a 2005 agreement in Sudan
 Comprehensive Performance Assessment, a UK Audit Commission assessment
 Comprehensive Plan of Action, a 1989 plan to stop the influx of Indochinese boat people
 Congress Party Alliance, a political party in the Republic of China (Taiwan)
 Council of Presidential Advisers, in Singapore
 Cyprus Ports Authority

Other organizations
 CPA Australia, a professional accounting body
 Canadian Payments Association
 Canadian Payroll Association
 Canadian Police Association
 Canadian Poolplayers Association
 Canadian Psychological Association
 Chinese Progressive Association (Boston), in the US
 College Park Academy, in Riverdale Park, Maryland, US
 Commission on Preservation and Access, now Council on Library and Information Resources, in the US
 Consumer Protection Association, in Myanmar
 CPA (agriculture) (Cooperativa de Producción Agropecuaria), a type of agricultural cooperative in Cuba
 Craft Potters Association, in the UK
 Catholic Patriotic Association, a Catholic organization in China
 Cyclistes Professionnels Associés, at Maison du Sport International in Lausanne, Switzerland

Project management and cost analysis
 Cost per action, an online advertising measurement and pricing model 
 Cost per activity, an internat marketing cost policy
 Critical path analysis, an algorithm for scheduling a set of project activities

Qualifications
 Chartered Patent Attorney, in the UK 
 Certified Practising Accountant, in Australia 
 Chartered Professional Accountant, in Canada 
 Certified Public Accountant, in the US

Science and technology

Medicine and health care
 Care Programme Approach, a British system of delivering community mental health services
 Cerebellopontine angle, in the brain
 Chronic pulmonary aspergillosis, a long-term fungal infection
 Collaborative practice agreement, a legal document between pharmacists and physicians in the US
 N6-Cyclopentyladenosine, a drug
 Cyproterone acetate, a medication

Information technology
 Chosen-plaintext attack, an attack model for cryptanalysis 
 Co-citation Proximity Analysis, a document similarity measure 
 Collaboration Protocol Agreement, a component of the ebXML standards
 Commercial Product Assurance, a form of information security validation

Other uses in science and technology
 Chirped pulse amplification, a technique for amplifying an ultrashort laser pulse
 Closest point of approach, measured by marine radar
 Coherent perfect absorber, a device which absorbs coherent light
 Coherent potential approximation, a method in physics of finding Green's function
 Chiral phosphoric acid, esters of phosphoric acid 
 Cyclopropane fatty acid, a subgroup of fatty acids
 CPA superfamily, of transport proteins

Other uses
 Cathay Pacific, ICAO airline code CPA
 Certified Public Assassins, a team featured on Extreme Dodgeball
 Classification of Products by Activity, a European standard classification of goods and services
 , postal codes in Argentina
 Community Postal Agent, of Australia Post 
 Community Preservation Act, a state law in Massachusetts, US
 Continuous partial attention, a term coined by Linda Stone in 1998 to describe a kind of multitasking
 Continuous payment authority, a type of regular automatic payment